The 1910 Delaware football team was an American football team that represented Delaware College (later renamed the University of Delaware) as an independent during the 1910 college football season. In its third season under head coach William McAvoy, the team compiled a 1–2–2 record and was outscored by a total of 49 to 19.  Carl A. Taylor was the team captain. The team played its home games in Newark, Delaware.

Schedule

References

Delaware
Delaware Fightin' Blue Hens football seasons
Delaware Fightin' Blue Hens football